Brazil participated in the 2010 Summer Youth Olympics in Singapore.

The Brazilian squad consisted of 81 athletes competing in 18 sports: aquatics (diving, swimming), athletics, basketball, boxing, canoeing, cycling, equestrian, fencing, gymnastics, handball, judo, modern pentathlon, rowing, sailing, shooting, table tennis, tennis, and triathlon.

Medalists

Athletics

Boys
Track and Road Events

Field Events

Girls
Track and Road Events

Field Events

Basketball

Girls

Boxing

Boys

Canoeing

Boys

Cycling

Cross Country

Time Trial

BMX

Road Race

Overall

Diving

Boys

Girls

Equestrian

Fencing

Group Stage

Knock-Out Stage

Gymnastics

Artistic Gymnastics

Boys

Girls

Trampoline

Handball

Boys

Girls

Judo

Individual

Team

Modern pentathlon

Rowing

Sailing

One Person Dinghy

Windsurfing

Shooting

Pistol

Swimming

Boys

Girls

Mixed

Table tennis

Individual

Team

Tennis

Singles

Doubles

Triathlon

Boys

Mixed

References

External links

Competitors List: Brazil

Youth Olympics
Nations at the 2010 Summer Youth Olympics
Brazil at the Youth Olympics